The Rival is a 1955 Italian-French melodrama film directed by Anton Giulio Majano.

Cast 

Anna Maria Ferrero: Barbara
Gérard Landry: Roberto
Maria Mauban: Agnese
Luisa Rivelli: Fides
Roberto Risso: Ugo Perelli
Nerio Bernardi: Prefect Candi
Aldo Bufi Landi: Corporal Ruffo
Laura Nucci: Miss Cardi
Nino Vingelli: Piedigrotta 
Gastone Moschin: Marco
Franca Dominici: Fides' Mother
Antonio Battistella: Gerardo
Arturo Bragaglia: Giuseppe 
Ivo Garrani: Official 
Cesare Fantoni

References

External links

1955 films
1955 drama films
Italian drama films
French drama films
Films directed by Anton Giulio Majano
Films scored by Alessandro Cicognini
Italian black-and-white films
French black-and-white films
Melodrama films
1950s Italian films
1950s French films